Uriël "Uri" Rosenthal (born 19 July 1945) is a retired Dutch politician of the People's Party for Freedom and Democracy (VVD) and political scientist.

Rosenthal a political scientist by occupation, was elected as a Member of the Senate on 8 June 1999 after the Senate election of 1999. On 5 May 2005 he was selected as the parliamentary leader of the People's Party for Freedom and Democracy in the Senate. Following the election of 2010 Rosenthal was asked to become Minister of Foreign Affairs in the Cabinet Rutte–Verhagen Rosenthal accepted and resigned as parliamentary leader in the Senate and a Member of the Senate the same day he took office as the new Minister of Foreign Affairs on 14 October 2010 serving until 5 November 2012.

A professor of political science and public administration by occupation, he taught from 1980 until 2010 at the Erasmus University Rotterdam and Leiden University.

Early life
Uriël Rosenthal was born on 19 July 1945 in Montreux, Switzerland to Jewish parents who during World War II fled the Netherlands from the German occupation of the Netherlands. They returned to the Netherlands shortly after the war ended. After attending school in The Hague, he went to study political science at the University of Amsterdam, where he obtained a Bachelor of Social Science and a Master of Social Science in 1970. In 1978 he received his Doctor of Philosophy in social sciences at the Erasmus University Rotterdam. In 1980 he became a professor of political science and public administration at the Erasmus University Rotterdam. From 1987 until 2011 he was a professor of public administration at the Leiden University.

Politics
He was elected Member of the Senate as a member of the People's Party for Freedom and Democracy and took office on 8 June 1999. He became the Parliamentary leader in the Senate on 5 May 2005. On 12 June 2010 Queen Beatrix nominated Rosenthal as first informateur in the 2010 Dutch cabinet formation. On 26 June the Queen replaced Rosenthal with Herman Tjeenk Willink, the Vice President of the Council of State as the new informateur. On 5 July he became informateur a second time together with Jacques Wallage of the Labour Party. But on 21 July the Queen again replaced him and Wallage with Minister of State and former Prime Minister Ruud Lubbers.

On 28 September 2010 the negotiations were finished. A coalition agreement was reached between People's Party for Freedom and Democracy and Christian Democratic Appeal to form a minority coalition, supported by the Party for Freedom to obtain a majority. Formateur Mark Rutte asked Rosenthal as the Minister of Foreign Affairs in the new cabinet. Because a member of the States-General of the Netherlands can not serve in the cabinet he resigned as a Member of the Senate and Parliamentary leader on 14 October 2010, the same day he took office as the new Minister of Foreign Affairs.

As of 1 March 2013, Rosenthal is chairman of the Policy Advisory Council on Science and Technology (AWT).

He has been nominated by the Dutch Government to serve as the Special Envoy  for the fourth International Cyberspace Conference to be held in 2015.

Family
He has been married since 4 January 1973. He lives in Rotterdam with his wife, Dinah, and their two children. Dinah Rosenthal is an Israeli native, originally from Haifa. Two of Rosenthal's sisters live in Israel.

Decorations

References

External links

Official
  Prof.Dr. U. (Uri) Rosenthal Parlement & Politiek
  Prof.Dr. U. Rosenthal (VVD) Eerste Kamer der Staten-Generaal

 

1945 births
Living people
Dutch bibliographers
Dutch columnists
Dutch essayists
Dutch expatriates in Israel
Dutch magazine editors
Dutch management consultants
Dutch nonprofit directors
Jewish Dutch politicians
Jewish Dutch scientists
Jewish Dutch writers
Dutch people of German-Jewish descent
Dutch political scientists
Dutch public administration scholars
Erasmus University Rotterdam alumni
Academic staff of Erasmus University Rotterdam
Experts on terrorism
Governmental studies academics
Academic staff of Leiden University
Jewish refugees
Members of the Senate (Netherlands)
Ministers of Foreign Affairs of the Netherlands
Non-fiction crime writers
Officers of the Order of Orange-Nassau
People from Montreux
Politicians from Rotterdam
People's Party for Freedom and Democracy politicians
Public historians
Terrorism studies
Terrorism theorists
University of Amsterdam alumni
Academic staff of the University of Amsterdam
20th-century Dutch civil servants
20th-century Dutch educators
20th-century Dutch male writers
20th-century Dutch politicians
21st-century Dutch civil servants
21st-century Dutch educators
21st-century Dutch male writers
21st-century Dutch politicians